Eckley may refer to:

Places
United States
 Eckley, California
 Eckley, Colorado
 Eckley Miners' Village, historical mining town in Pennsylvania

People with the surname
 Sherman W. Eckley (1866-1928), American politician